The 1957 Caen Grand Prix was a motor race, run to Formula One rules, held on 28 July 1957 at the Circuit de la Prairie, Caen. The race was run over 86 laps of the circuit, and was won by a lap by French driver Jean Behra in a BRM P25, the first Grand Prix win for the P25. Behra also set pole and fastest lap.

Classification

1 Schell raced the spare BRM after his Maserati 250F broke a piston during practice.

References

Caen Grand Prix
Caen Grand Prix
Caen Grand Prix